Myrmosicarius is a genus of flies in the family Phoridae.

Species
M. biarticulatus Borgmeier, 1931
M. brandaoi Disney, 2006
M. catharinensis Borgmeier, 1928
M. cristobalensis Disney, 2006
M. crudelis Borgmeier, 1928
M. cuspidatus Borgmeier, 1928
M. diabolicus Borgmeier, 1931
M. gonzalezae Disney, 2006
M. gracilipes Borgmeier, 1928
M. grandicornis Borgmeier, 1928
M. infestans Borgmeier, 1931
M. longipalpis Disney, 2006
M. persecutor Borgmeier, 1931
M. simplex Borgmeier & Prado, 1975
M. tarsipennis Borgmeier, 1928
M. texanus (Greene, 1938)

References

Phoridae
Platypezoidea genera